Yelko Marino Gómez Valdés (born March 9, 1989 in Chiriquí Province) is a Panamanian cyclist, who rides for UCI Continental team .

Major results
Source: 

2008
 2nd Road race, National Under-23 Road Championships
2011
 1st Memorial Avelino Camacho
 2nd Vuelta a Navarra
2012
 1st Stage 3 Vuelta a Castilla y León
2014
 1st  Time trial, National Road Championships
 7th Overall Vuelta Ciclista a Costa Rica
2015
 1st  Time trial, National Road Championships
2018
 2nd Time trial, National Road Championships
2021
 3rd  Road race, Central American Road Championships

References

External links

1989 births
Living people
Panamanian male cyclists
20th-century Panamanian people
21st-century Panamanian people